Guy Smith (born November 17, 1957, in Augusta, Georgia) is a San Francisco based writer. Smith has published both fiction and non-fiction, and bills himself as a "writer, songwriter, and political provocateur."

Smith describes a childhood that included simultaneously being a surfer and a working cowboy. His writing career began while working at Kennedy Space Center, writing articles for trade press. This led to his first book devoted to architecture of the Hewlett-Packard 3000 computer.

In San Francisco Smith began writing politically focused opinion pieces for Bay Area newspapers (San Francisco Chronicle, Oakland Tribune, Contra Costa Times). While in San Francisco he expanded into fiction, publishing his first novella (Afterlife). His speaking engagements include the Libertarian National Convention and the Gun Rights Policy Conference.

Books published 
Guns and Control (2020, Skyhorse): 
Shooting the Bull (2011, Free Thinkers Media): 
Afterlife (2009, G3 Media) 
Gun Facts (1999–2015)
The HP3000 Bible (1988,PCI Press)

Political observations

Media and Social Media
In Shooting The Bull, Smith claims that a critical shift in political information has occurred.  He notes that traditional media sources (or mainstream media) are no longer in control of the national conversation – that analysis and decisions concerning political “facts” and policy are now in the hands of the citizen media.

 “When a few million intelligent but bored individuals are given a unified platform for research, analysis and sharing, power shifts from the organized Fourth Estate to the unorganized Fifth.”

Smith concludes that even though the citizen media produces misinformation, it has disabled centralized or institutionalized misinformation due to ongoing public propaganda analysis.

"Smith Doctrine"
Smith has articulated a "long view" doctrine for American Foreign policy. The doctrine ties U.S. economic engagement to the civil and human rights records of the partner country. The anticipated effect is that economic vitality will be limited to nations with strong civil and human rights records.

Discography

References

21st-century American novelists
American political writers
American male novelists
1957 births
Living people
20th-century American novelists
20th-century American male writers
21st-century American male writers
20th-century American non-fiction writers
21st-century American non-fiction writers
American male non-fiction writers